The Treasure of Osztrópataka (today Ostrovany, northeastern Slovakia), is an East Germanic burial site dating to the late 3rd century. It was discovered in 1790 and is displayed today in the Kunsthistorisches Museum in Vienna, Austria. Further contents of the burial discovered in 1865 are located at the Hungarian National Museum in Budapest, Hungary. The treasure includes Germanic and above all Roman objects, and probably belonged to an influential Vandalic king from around 270–90. It is one of the most important early-historical findings from Slovakia.

See also

 Ring of Pietroassa
 Pietroasele Treasure

References

Vandals
Treasure troves of late antiquity
Archaeology of Slovakia
Germanic archaeological artifacts
Treasure troves in Slovakia
1790 archaeological discoveries